Shane McGuigan is a British boxing coach. He is the son of former featherweight world champion Barry McGuigan.

Notable fighters
Chantelle Cameron (2017–2019)
Luke Campbell (2018–2021)
Conrad Cummings (2014–2017)
Daniel Dubois (2021–)
 Anthony Fowler (2020–)
Carl Frampton (2013–2017)
George Groves (2015–2018)
David Haye (2016–2017)
Lee McGregor (2017–2018)
Lawrence Okolie (2019–)
Chris Billam-Smith (2017–)
Josh Taylor (2015–2020)

References

1988 births
Living people
English male boxers
Boxing trainers